The Bishop of St Asaph heads the Church in Wales diocese of St Asaph.

The diocese covers the counties of Conwy and Flintshire, Wrexham county borough, the eastern part of Merioneth in Gwynedd and part of northern Powys. The Episcopal seat is located in the Cathedral Church of St Asaph in the city of St Asaph in Denbighshire, north Wales.

The Bishop's residence is Esgobty, St Asaph. The current bishop is Gregory Cameron, who was elected on 5 January and consecrated on 4 April 2009. He became Bishop of St Asaph in succession to John Davies, who was consecrated in October 1999 and who retired in 2008.

Early times
This diocese was supposedly founded by St Kentigern (Cyndeyrn) about the middle of the 6th century, although this is unlikely. The date often given is 583. Exiled from his see in Scotland, Kentigern is said to have founded a monastery called Llanelwy – which is the Welsh name for St Asaph – at the confluence of the rivers Clwyd and Elwy in north Wales, where after his return to Scotland he was succeeded by Asaph or Asa, who was consecrated Bishop of Llanelwy. The Diocese of Llanelwy originally largely coincided with the kingdom of Powys, together with the part of the kingdom of Gwynedd known as Gwynedd Is Conwy, but lost much territory first by the Mercian encroachment marked by Watt's dyke and again by the construction of Offa's Dyke, soon after 798. Nothing is known of the history of the diocese during the disturbed period that followed. Some historians doubt the existence of the diocese per se before the Norman period, and the bishop list and the fact that the Diocese of Bangor, in the kingdom of Gwynedd, held large tracts of land there tends to confirm this.

Middle Ages
Domesday Book gives scanty particulars of a few churches but is silent as to the cathedral. Early in the twelfth century Norman influence asserted itself and in 1143 Theobald, Archbishop of Canterbury, consecrated one Gilbert as Bishop of St. Asaph, but the position of his successors was very difficult and one of them, Godfrey, was driven away by poverty and the hostility of the Welsh. A return made in the middle of the thirteenth century (London, British Library, Cotton Vitellius, c. x.) shows the existence of eight rural deaneries, seventy-nine churches, and nineteen chapels. By 1291 the deaneries had been doubled in number and there were Cistercian houses at Basingwerk, Aberconwy, Strata Marcella and Valle Crucis, and a Cistercian nunnery, Llanllugan Abbey. The cathedral, which had been burnt in the wars, was rebuilt and completed in 1295.  Dedicated to St Asaph, it was a plain massive structure of simple plan, and was again destroyed during the Wars of the Roses. When it was restored by Bishop Redman the palace was not rebuilt and thus the bishops continued to be nonresident, notwithstanding the fact that in the late Middle Ages the bishop had five episcopal residences, four of which were alienated under Edward VI of England. Redman was abbot of Shap Abbey and visitor for the Premonstratensian canons, and spent most of his time visiting their monasteries or his diocese; he was diligent in his duties and felt no need to be resident in the city. At the end of the fifteenth century there was a great revival of church building, as is evidenced by the churches of that date still existing in the diocese. The chief shrines in the diocese were St Winefred's Well, St Garmon in Yale, St Derfel Gadarn in Edeirnion, St Melangell at Pennant, and the Holy Cross in Strata Marcella. All these were demolished at the Reformation. At that time the diocese contained one archdeaconry, sixteen deaneries, and one hundred and twenty-one parishes.

The names and succession of the bishops after Saints Kentigern and Asaph are not clearly known until 1143. The last bishop in communion with Rome was Thomas Goldwell, who acceded in 1555 and was in the process of being transferred to Oxford when Queen Mary died and Elizabeth I came to the throne. Goldwell fled to the Continent and died in Rome on 13 April 1585, the last surviving member of the pre-Reformation hierarchy. 

The Report of the Commissioners appointed by his Majesty to inquire into the Ecclesiastical Revenues of England and Wales (1835) found the see had an annual net income of £6,301. This made it the wealthiest diocese in Wales and the fourth richest in Britain after Canterbury, London and Winchester.

The see continued to be part of the Church of England until the Church was disestablished in Wales in 1920, since when it has been part of the (Anglican) Church in Wales.

List of the Bishops of St Asaph

Pre-reformation bishops

During the Reformation

Post-Reformation

Bishops of the Church of England

Bishops of the disestablished Church in Wales

Assistant bishops
Among those who have served as assistant bishops of the diocese have been:
1993–1996: Huw Jones, later Bishop of St Davids

Notes

References 
 Haydn's Book of Dignities (1894) Joseph Haydn/Horace Ockerby, reprinted 1969
 Whitaker's Almanack 1883 to 2004 Joseph Whitaker & Sons Ltd/A&C Black, London
 https://web.archive.org/web/20050320015243/http://tejones.net/religion/Bishops/

St Asaph
 
Bishop of Saint Asaph
St Asaph
Lists of people by city in Wales